Simen Raaen Sandmæl (born 4 August 1990) is a former Norwegian footballer.

Career
Sandmæl started his career at Remyra as a junior, he then moved to Stjørdals-Blink in 2011. After two season in Stjørdals-Blink, he then moved to Levanger in 2014. He moved to Ranheim in 2016.

Sandmæl made his debut for Ranheim in a 2-1 loss against FK Jerv.

Sandmæl went back to Levanger on 14 August 2018. On 9 January 2019, Sandmæl signed with KÍ Klaksvík.

Career statistics

Honours
 KÍ Klaksvík
Faroese Premier League (1): 2019

References

1990 births
Living people
People from Meråker
Norwegian footballers
Association football midfielders
Levanger FK players
Ranheim Fotball players
KÍ Klaksvík players
IL Stjørdals-Blink players
Eliteserien players
Norwegian First Division players
Norwegian Second Division players
Faroe Islands Premier League players
Norwegian expatriate footballers
Expatriate footballers in the Faroe Islands
Norwegian expatriate sportspeople in the Faroe Islands
Sportspeople from Trøndelag